Theodoros Tzinis (*1798 ; †1869) was a Greek hero of the Greek War of Independence.

He was born in Kompoti, Arta in 1798 and was the main friend of Nikolaos Skoufas, a leader of Filiki Etaireia. He battled against the Turks in Messolongi and was one of the organisers of the escape. After the escape, he settled in Patras, in 1828.  He founded a neighbourhood in 1831 and bought property in the modern centre of the city and built his house. From that time, his family received the name to the neighbourhood (Tsivdi) of the city. In Patras, he was educated with the grape company and married Eleni Papapostolou, with whom he raised six children.

He died in Patras.

References
The first version of the article is translated and is based from the article at the Greek Wikipedia (el:Main Page)

1798 births
1869 deaths
Greek revolutionaries
Greek people of the Greek War of Independence

People from Arta (regional unit)